Estrella Roja Fútbol Club (usually called Estrella Roja) is a professional football club promoted to the Venezuelan league in 2007, based in Caracas.

Squad

{{Primera División Venezolana}}
Association football clubs established in 2004
Football clubs in Venezuela
Football clubs in Caracas
2004 establishments in Venezuela
Defunct football clubs in Venezuela